Jori Aro is a Finnish curler.

At the national level, he is a four-time Finnish men's champion curler (1989, 1990, 1991, 1995).

Teams

References

External links

 Video: 

Living people
Finnish male curlers
Finnish curling champions
Year of birth missing (living people)
Place of birth missing (living people)
21st-century Finnish people